Oh Lucy! is a short film directed by Atsuko Hirayanagi.  The short film made its world premiere at the 2014 Cannes Film Festival receiving 2nd place in the Cinéfondation.  Oh Lucy! has since become Academy Qualified by winning the Best International Short Film Award at the 2015 Flickerfest as well as the Short Film Jury Award: International Fiction at the 2015 Sundance Film Festival.

Hirayanagi later made the film into a feature film version, released in 2017.

Synopsis
Setsuko, a 55-year-old single 'office lady' in Tokyo, is given a blonde wig and a new identity, "Lucy," by her young unconventional English instructor. "Lucy" awakens desires Setsuko never knew she had. When the instructor suddenly disappears, Setsuko must come to terms with what remains – herself.

Awards

Release
The short has been shown at over 50 film festivals and is currently touring in theaters as a part of the Sundance FIlm Festival Award-winning short film tour.

References

External links
 
 
 https://web.archive.org/web/20141028153720/http://blogs.indiewire.com/womenandhollywood/tiff-women-directors-meet-atsuko-hirayanagi-oh-lucy-20140910
 https://web.archive.org/web/20180219210714/http://www.cinefondation.com/en/news/32

2014 short films
2014 films
Japanese short films
2010s Japanese films